Fuller was an electoral district of the Legislative Assembly in the Australian state of New South Wales, created in 1968 in the Ryde area and named after George Fuller, Premier of New South Wales, 1922–1925. It was abolished in 1981 and largely replaced by Gladesville.

Members for Fuller

Election results

References

Former electoral districts of New South Wales
1968 establishments in Australia
1981 disestablishments in Australia
Constituencies established in 1968
Constituencies disestablished in 1981